The double-collared crescentchest (Melanopareia bitorquata) is a species of bird in the family Melanopareiidae. It is found in eastern Bolivia.

Taxonomy and systematics

The crescentchests (genus Melanopareia) were previously included in family Rhinocryptidae, the tapaculos. A 2010 publication confirmed earlier work and created their present genus. The International Ornithological Congress (IOC) recognizes the double-collared crescentchest as a species. However, the South American Classification Committee of the American Ornithological Society (AOS) and the Clements taxonomy consider it to be a subspecies of collared crescentchest (Melanopareia torquata bitorquata).

Description

The double-collared crescentchest has a similar pattern to that of the collared crescentchest but the colors are deeper or different in several areas. Its upper parts are olive brown rather than brown and the underparts a deep ochre instead of buff. It has the same black-bordered white supercilium but the "collar" at the back of the neck is a deeper rufous shade and has a black border.

Distribution and habitat

The double-collared crescentchest is found in Bolivia's Santa Cruz Department and the western edge of Brazil's Mato Grosso State. It inhabits cerrado, a biome characterized by a mix of savannah and woodlands.

Behavior

The double-collared crescentchest's diet has not been described but the species is assumed to be insectivorous. Examples of its song are here .

Status

The IUCN has not assessed the double-collared crescentchest.

References

double-collared crescentchest
double-collared crescentchest